Joey Altman  is an American chef, restaurateur, television host and writer.

Early life and education
Altman grew up in the Catskills in New York, where his father was an attorney and judge and his mother sold cosmetics at Grossinger's Catskill Resort Hotel. As a child he wanted to be a magician, a stunt man, musician or an actor. He earned a degree in hotel and restaurant management at the Sullivan County Community College in New York.

Career
He trained under Bernard Constantin at the Hotel Larivoire in Lyon, France, and with Jean Brouilly at Tarare in Brittany, France. He worked under chef Bob Kinkaide at the Harvest Restaurant in Cambridge, Massachusetts. In 1985 he moved to New Orleans, Louisiana to work for Emeril Lagasse at Commander's Palace.

In San Francisco he worked for Jeremiah Tower at Stars, Taxi, and as a private chef at music promoter Bill Graham's concert venues. In 1989 he opened Miss Pearl's Jam House, a restaurant at the Phoenix Hotel in San Francisco's Tenderloin District. He owned and ran the Wild Hare Restaurant in Menlo Park, California from 1999 to 2003. From 2002-2017, Altman was spokesman for Diageo Chateau & Estate Wines. Altman has had an extensive culinary consulting career working on a wide variety of projects from Tommy Bahama to opening an award winning restaurant in Mumbai India with his cousin, chef Alex Sanchez. In 2017 Altman worked as Director of Culinary Operations with George Chen to open San Francisco's most ambitious Chinese restaurant, China Live.

Television career
At Food Network, Altman hosted "Appetite for Adventure", which demonstrated outdoor travel cooking, and "Tasting Napa", a travelogue. He was the host of "What's Cooking with Joey Altman" on Shop at Home Network. In 1998 he launched the long-running "Bay Cafe", which features on-location and in-studio cooking demonstrations with guest chefs from around the San Francisco Bay Area.

Teaching 
Altman has taught cooking classes around the country and regularly a guest chef instructor at Rancho La Puerta, a premier spa resort in Tecate, Mexico.

Awards
James Beard Foundation Award broadcast media awards for "Best Local Television Cooking Series" in: 2000, 2001, 2006.

Personal life
Altman is married to Jaemie Altman, a restaurant financial consultant and CEO of Alice Water's Lulu Restaurant at the Hammer Museum in Los Angeles. Together they have 3 children; Johanna and Caleb Malaer and Piper Altman. Joey Altman is also a blues guitarist, and founding member of the all-chef band "Back Burner Blues" which played for many charity events from 2001-2018.

Bibliography
with Jennie Schacht. Without Reservations: How to Make Bold, Creative, Flavorful Food at Home. Hoboken: Wiley (2008).

References

External links

Year of birth missing (living people)
Living people
American television chefs
American male chefs
Food Network chefs
Writers from San Francisco
Chefs from New York (state)
American food writers
People from the Catskills
Chefs from California
American cookbook writers
21st-century American male writers
21st-century American non-fiction writers
21st-century American guitarists
American blues guitarists
Chefs from San Francisco